Harry van Rappard (12 December 1897 – November 1982) was a Dutch sprinter. He competed in the men's 100 metres at the 1920 Summer Olympics.

References

External links
 

1897 births
1982 deaths
Athletes (track and field) at the 1920 Summer Olympics
Dutch male sprinters
Olympic athletes of the Netherlands
People from Probolinggo